Sabina Zairkyzy Azimbayeva (Sabina Zairqyzy Äzımbaeva; born 14 February 2000) is a Kazakh model and beauty pageant titleholder who was crowned Miss Almaty 2017 and represented Kazakhstan in Miss Universe 2018. She placed in the top five at Miss Kazakhstan 2018.

Life and career
Azimbayeva was born in Almaty, Kazakhstan. She is a student at the College of Almaty and works as a model by profession.

Pageantry
On 13 September 2017, Azimbayeva was crowned Miss Almaty 2017 and she succeeded outgoing Miss Almaty 2016 Kamilla Asylova. She then competed at Kazakhstan 2018 and placed 1st runner-up.  Since the winner of Miss Kazakhstan goes to the Miss World competition, Azimbayeva represented Kazakhstan at Miss Universe 2018 pageant.

References

External links

2000 births
Kazakhstani beauty pageant winners
Kazakhstani female models
Living people
Miss Universe 2018 contestants
People from Almaty